Abdelkader Bakhtache (born 30 January 1982 in Thonon-les-Bains) is a retired French middle-distance runner who specialised in the 1500 metres. He represented his country at the 2010 World Indoor Championships without advancing from the first round. In addition, he finished fourth at the 2007 European Indoor Championships. Until 2006 he represented Algeria.

International competitions

Personal bests
Outdoor
800 metres – 1:48.74 (La Roche-sur-Yon 2007)
1000 metres – 2:19.89 (Grenoble 2009)
1500 metres – 3:38.24 (Strasbourg 2007)
3000 metres – 8:10.79 (Vénissieux 2007)
5000 metres – 14:38.74 (Vénissieux 2015)
10 kilometres – 30:32 (Paris 2006)
Indoor
1500 metres – 3:38.32 (Liévin 2010)

References

1982 births
Living people
French male middle-distance runners
People from Thonon-les-Bains
French sportspeople of Algerian descent
Sportspeople from Haute-Savoie
Athletes (track and field) at the 2009 Mediterranean Games
Mediterranean Games competitors for France